Europalia is a major international arts festival held every two years to celebrate one invited country’s cultural heritage. Europalia was established in Brussels in 1969, and from the beginning Europalia was designed to be a multidisciplinary cultural festival.

Its name is a combination of two words: "Europe" and "Opalia", an ancient Roman harvest festival held in mid-December in honour of Ops, earth-goddess and fertility deity. Her name lies at the root of the Latin word "Opus", that denotes a work of art.

The main Europalia events traditionally take place in the Belgian capital, but many other cities across the country also host exhibitions and performances. For several years other European cities (in the Netherlands, France, Luxembourg and Germany) have been associated with Europalia and also offer activities on the festival programme.

From the beginning of October to January, the culture of the invited country is illustrated in a prestigious series of exhibitions — ancient, modern and contemporary art, photography, crafts, mode and design — and also a variety of events : orchestras, musical ensembles and soloists, theatre, dance, literary and scientific colloquia, conferences, cinema retrospectives, folkloric and popular traditional performances, gastronomy combine with exhibitions to offer the most complete view possible of a country’s arts and culture. This is the highly original formula of Europalia.

Each festival develops a partnership, not only with the chosen country but also with prominent museums, cultural centres and performance halls in Belgium and neighbouring countries. The festival expenses are shared between Belgium and the invited country. Europalia is financially supported by Belgium’s national, regional and community governments and numerous private companies.

Europalia calls on the collaboration of the most renowned international specialists to help conceive the festival, as well as to participate in colloquia and conferences. Europalia events are extensively covered by television, radio and print media, and attract a large European audience, eager to discover a country’s cultural treasures assembled exceptionally for more than three months in this important festival.

History of festivals

 1969 Italy
 1971 Netherlands
 1973 Great Britain
 1975 France
 1977 Federal Republic of Germany
 1980 Belgium
 1982 Greece
 1985 Spain
 1987 Austria
 1989 Japan
 1991 Portugal
 1993 Mexico
 1996 Victor Horta
 1998 Czech Republic
 1999 Hungary
 2000 Brussels
 2001 Poland
 2002 Bulgaria
 2003 Italy
 2005 Russia
 2007 EU-27
 2009 China
 2011 Brazil
 2013 India
 2015 Turkey
 2017 Indonesia
 2019 Romania
 2021 Trains & Tracks
 2023 Georgia

See also
 European Capital of Culture

Sources
 Europalia

Foundations based in Belgium
Tourism in Belgium
European culture
Recurring events established in 1969
1969 establishments in Belgium